Cafu (Marcos Evangelista de Morais; born 1970) is a Brazilian former professional footballer.

Cafu may also refer to:
 Cafú (footballer, born 1977), full name Arlindo Gomes Semedo, Cape Verdean football forward
 Cafu (footballer, born 1987), full name Filipe Francisco dos Santos, Brazilian footballer
 Cafú (footballer, born 1993), full name Carlos Miguel Ribeiro Dias, Portuguese footballer
 Cafu (footballer, born 1996), full name Octacilio Brito Alves, Brazilian footballer
 Jonathan Cafú, (born 1991), Brazilian footballer (winger)
 Wanderson Cafu (born 1986), Brazilian football right back

See also
 Cafu Engine, a game engine